Chaetostoma pearsei is a species of catfish in the family Loricariidae. It is native to South America, where it occurs in the basins of the Tuy River and Lake Valencia in Venezuela. The species reaches 15 cm (5.9 inches) in total length.

References 

pearsei
Fish described in 1920